Benjamin John Rich (born 10 January 1985) is a British meteorologist and BBC Weather forecaster.

Early life
Benjamin John Rich was born on 10 January 1985 in Plymouth and was raised in rural Devon. At school Rich gave classmates and teachers daily handmade weather forecasts.

Rich studied for a degree in Geography and Environmental Science at the University of Southampton, and then completed an MA in Broadcast Journalism at University College Falmouth.

Career
Rich worked as a newsreader for a short time and was then a reporter for local radio stations in Bristol and Manchester. He became a weather presenter for BBC's Midlands Today in Birmingham in 2009, providing daily weather forecasts and presenting regional TV news bulletins. He also produced in-depth features on weather-related subjects such as climate change.

He presented national and international weather forecasts at the BBC from late 2012 to late 2013, when he commenced studies at the Met Office College in Exeter to complete his training as a meteorologist. He broadcasts at the BBC and provides forecasts for RAF pilots.

He was described by Charlie Stayt on BBC Breakfast on 30 May 2020 as having a smile like the Cheshire Cat. Rich then stated after the comment that nobody had previously described his smile in such a way before.

Personal life
Rich enjoys the performing arts, dining out, and travel, attending the Edinburgh Festival Fringe each summer. At his Twitter account he describes himself as "Lover of coffee, cocktails, travel, music, theatre, comedy and cinema." He plays violin in the London Gay Symphony Orchestra.

References

External links
 
 

1985 births
BBC weather forecasters
Living people
Alumni of the University of Southampton
Alumni of Falmouth University
Mass media people from Plymouth, Devon